Agetocera is a genus of skeletonizing leaf beetles in the family Chrysomelidae. There are more than 25 described species in Agetocera. They are found in Indomalaya and the Palaearctic, especially in China.

Species
These 28 species belong to the genus Agetocera:

 Agetocera abdominalis Jiang, 1992 (China)
 Agetocera biclava Zhang & Yang, 2005 (China)
 Agetocera birmanica Jacoby, 1891 (Burma)
 Agetocera carinicornis Chen, 1964 (China)
 Agetocera chapana Laboissiere, 1929 (China, Vietnam, Burma)
 Agetocera choui Lee, Bezdek & Staines, 2010  (Taiwan)
 Agetocera cyanipennis Yang, 2001 (China)
 Agetocera deformicornis Laboissiere, 1927 (China, Vietnam)
 Agetocera discedens Weise, 1922  (Tiawan)
 Agetocera duporti Laboissiere, 1927 (Vietnam)
 Agetocera femoralis Chen, 1942 (China)
 Agetocera filicornis Laboissiere, 1927 (China, Vietnam)
 Agetocera flaviventris Jacoby, 1879 (India, Burma)
 Agetocera hopei Baly, 1865 (China, Indomalaya)
 Agetocera huatungensis Lee, Bezdek & Staines, 2010  (Taiwan)
 Agetocera lobicornis Baly, 1865  (India, Burma)
 Agetocera manipuria Maulik, 1932
 Agetocera mirabilis (Hope, 1831) (China, Indomalaya)
 Agetocera nigripennis Laboissiere, 1927 (China, Vietnam)
 Agetocera orientalis Weise, 1902 (Vietnam)
 Agetocera parva Chen, 1964 (China)
 Agetocera silva Bezděk, 2009
 Agetocera similis Chen, 1997 (China)
 Agetocera sokolovi Medvedev, 1981 (Vietnam)
 Agetocera taiwana Chujo, 1962 (Taiwan)
 Agetocera yuae Lee, Bezdek & Staines, 2010  (Taiwan)
 Agetocera yunnana Chen, 1964 (China)

References

Galerucinae
Chrysomelidae genera
Taxa named by Frederick William Hope